Aşağı Hacılar (Laz language: Borghola) is a quarter of the town Arhavi, Arhavi District, Artvin Province, Turkey. Its population is 1,393 (2021). Most inhabitants of the neighbourhood are ethnically Laz.

References

Arhavi District
Laz settlements in Turkey